Main North Line can refer to the following railway lines:

 Main North railway line, New South Wales, Australia
 Main North Line, New Zealand